The Family Business is a 1989 Australian sitcom about two sisters and their husbands who live near each other.

References

External links

Australian television sitcoms
1989 Australian television series debuts
1989 Australian television series endings